Mr. Gilfil's Love Story is a 1920 British silent drama film directed by A. V. Bramble and starring Robert Henderson Bland, Mary Odette and Peter Upcher. It was based on the short story Mr. Gilfil's Love Story from George Eliot's 1857 work Scenes of Clerical Life. A chaplain to an aristocratic British family falls in love with their ward, a young Italian woman, who he marries. Tragedy strikes when she dies only a few months later, leaving him in a state of grief.

Cast
  Robert Henderson Bland - Maynard Gilfil  
  Mary Odette - Caterina  
  Peter Upcher - Anthony Wybrow  
  Dora De Winton - Lady Clevere  
  A. Harding Steerman - Sir Christopher Chever  
  Aileen Bagot - Beatrice Asscher  
  Norma Whalley - Lady Asscher  
  John Boella - Signor Sarti  
  Irene Drew - Dorcas  
  Robert Clifton - Knott

References

External links
 
"Mr. Gilfil's Love Story" free PDF of Blackwood's 1878 Cabinet Edition (the critical standard with Eliot's final corrections) at the George Eliot Archive

1920 films
British drama films
British silent feature films
Films directed by A. V. Bramble
1920 drama films
Films based on short fiction
Ideal Film Company films
British black-and-white films
1920s English-language films
1920s British films
Silent drama films